Goldway may refer to:

 Ruth Y. Goldway, American member of the Postal Regulatory Commission
 Shenzhen Goldway Industrial, Chinese manufacturer of medical devices